This is a list of ballet dancers from the Russian Empire, Soviet Union, and Russian Federation, including both ethnic Russians and people of other ethnicities. This list includes as well those who were born in these three states but later emigrated, and those who were born elsewhere but immigrated to the country and performed there for a significant portion of their careers.

The original purpose of the ballet in Russia was to entertain the royal court. The first ballet company was the Imperial School of Ballet in St. Petersburg in the 1740s. The Ballets Russes was a ballet company founded in the 1909 by Sergey Diaghilev, an enormously important figure in the Russian ballet scene. Diaghilev and his Ballets Russes' travels abroad profoundly influenced the development of dance worldwide. The headquarters of his ballet company was located in Paris, France. A protégé of Diaghilev, George Balanchine, founded the New York City Ballet Company.

During the early 20th century, many Russian ballet dancers rose to fame. Soviet ballet preserved the perfected 19th century traditions, and the Soviet Union's choreography schools produced one internationally famous star after another. The Bolshoi Ballet in Moscow and the Mariinsky in Saint Petersburg remain famous throughout the world.

For the full plain list of Russian ballet dancers on Wikipedia see the :Category:Russian ballet dancers.

Alphabetical list


A

B

C

D

E

F

G

I

K

L

M

N

O

P

R

S

T

U

V

Y

Z

See also

References

External links

 
Ballet dancers, List of Russian
Ballet-related lists
Lists of dancers